AKM Shamsuddin is a Jatiya Party (Ershad) politician and the former Member of Parliament of Pabna-3.

Career
Shamsuddin was elected to parliament from Pabna-3 as a Jatiya Party candidate in 1988.

References

Jatiya Party politicians
Living people
4th Jatiya Sangsad members
Year of birth missing (living people)